Richard Regehr (born January 17, 1983) is an Indonesian-born Canadian professional ice hockey defenceman currently playing for EC KAC of the Austrian Hockey League (EBEL). Regehr's older brother is former Stanley Cup winning defenceman Robyn Regehr.

Early life
Regehr was born in Bandung, Indonesia to Canadian Mennonite missionaries.  They later returned to Canada where he grew up in Rosthern, Saskatchewan.

Playing career
Regehr was signed as a free agent on July 6, 2004 as an undrafted player by the Calgary Flames, the team where his brother Robyn was playing.  During the 2004–05 NHL lockout Richie Regehr played for the Lowell Lock Monsters, who were the American Hockey League affiliate of the Flames. In the 2005–06 season, he was sent to the Flames' new farm team, Omaha Ak-Sar-Ben Knights. After injuries to defencemen Rhett Warrener and Roman Hamrlík late in 2005, Regehr was called up to the Flames.

In his first National Hockey League game on December 29, 2005, he dressed with his brother Robyn and scored an assist on the game-winning goal. After only 3 games the Flames sent him back down to the Ak-Sar-Ben Knights, but on January 7 he was once again recalled. Regehr was recalled by Calgary again on February 2, 2006.

Regehr replaced Knights teammate Mark Giordano (who was recalled to the Calgary Flames) at the 2006 Canadian AHL All-Star team. He registered a goal and an assist in the All-Star game.

In the 2007–08 season, he moved to Germany, joining Deutsche Eishockey Liga (DEL) club Frankfurt Lions. The following year, he signed with fellow DEL side Eisbären Berlin.

After four impressive seasons with Berlin and winning three German championships with the club, Regehr left to sign a two-year contract in the Swedish Elitserien with Modo Hockey on April 25, 2012.

Regehr returned to Germany at the conclusion of his contract with Modo, signing a one-year deal with EHC München of the DEL on May 26, 2014. He eventually stayed in München until the conclusion of the 2016–17 season. He had won back-to-back German championships with München in 2016 and 2017 and signed with EC KAC of the Austrian Hockey League in May 2017.

Records
 DEL – Most goals in a game by a defenceman: five (October 31, 2007)

Career statistics

Awards and honours

References

External links

Richie Regehr Career Stats

1983 births
Calgary Flames players
Canadian Mennonites
Canadian ice hockey defencemen
Eisbären Berlin players
Frankfurt Lions players
Ice hockey people from Saskatchewan
Kelowna Rockets players
Living people
Lowell Lock Monsters players
Modo Hockey players
EHC München players
Omaha Ak-Sar-Ben Knights players
Sportspeople from Bandung
People from Rosthern, Saskatchewan
Portland Winterhawks players
Undrafted National Hockey League players
Canadian expatriate ice hockey players in Germany
Canadian sportspeople of Indonesian descent
Canadian expatriate ice hockey players in Sweden
People from Bandung
EC KAC players